When London Sleeps is a 1932 British crime film directed by Leslie S. Hiscott and starring Harold French, Francis L. Sullivan, Diana Beaumont and René Ray. It was filmed at Twickenham Studios in west London. It was based on a play by Charles Darrell.

Premise
A well-born gambler comes to the rescue of a travelling circus in financial difficulties.

Cast
 Harold French as Tommy Blythe
 Francis L. Sullivan as Rodney Haines
 René Ray as Mary
 A. Bromley Davenport as Colonel Grahame
 Alexander Field as Sam
 Diana Beaumont as Hilde
 Ben Field as Lamberti
 Barbara Everest as Mme Lamberti
 Herbert Lomas as Pollard
 James Knight as Garnett

References

External links

1932 films
British crime films
1932 crime films
1930s English-language films
Films directed by Leslie S. Hiscott
Films set in London
Films set in England
Films shot at Twickenham Film Studios
British black-and-white films
1930s British films